Ələt (also, Älät, Aliat, Aljat, Aliaty, Alyat, Alyat-Pristan’, Alyati-Pristan’, Alyaty, and Alyaty-Pristan’) is a settlement and municipality in Baku, Azerbaijan.  It has a population of 12,765.  The municipality consists of the settlements of Ələt, Pirsaat, Baş Ələt, Yeni Ələt, Qarakosa, Kotal, and Şıxlar.

See also
Gil Island (Azerbaijan)

References 

Populated places in Baku
Port cities in Azerbaijan
Municipalities of Baku